Inspector of Fighters (German language: Inspekteur der Jagdflieger redesignated to General der Jagdflieger (General of Fighters)) was not a rank but a leading position within the High Command of the German Luftwaffe in Nazi Germany. The inspector was responsible for the readiness, training and tactics of the fighter force. It was not an operational command.

Inspectors

|-style="text-align:center;"
| colspan=6| Inspekteur der Jagdflieger

|-style="text-align:center;"
| colspan=6| General der Jagdflieger

Subordinated inspectors

Inspector of the Day Fighters

Inspector of the Night Fighters

Notes

References
 

Luftwaffe
Military ranks of Germany